
This is a list of aircraft in alphabetical order beginning with 'S'.

Si

SIA
(Società Incremento Aviazione, Cameri)
 Gabardini 1911 Le Monaco monoplane
 Gabardini 1912 flying boat
 Gabardini 1913 monoplane
 Gabardini 1914 biplane

SIA 
(Societá Industriale l'Aviazone)
 Bastianelli P.R.B.

SIA-Delaunay-Belleville 
(Société Industrielle d'Aviation - Etablissements Delaunay-Belleville)
 S.I.A.-Coanda BN2
 S.I.A.-Coanda Lorraine bomber

SIA 
(Società Italiana Aviazione / Società Italiana degli Aeroplani)
 SIA FB
 SIA 7
 SIA R2
 SIA 9B

SIA
(Società Italiana degli Aeroplani / Enrico Luzzatto)
 SIA 1913 racing monoplane Roma
 SIA 1913 Circuito dei Laghi floatplane (Roma on floats)

SIAI 
(Società Italiana Aeroplani Idrovolanti / Societa Idrovolanti Alta Italia - S.I.A.I)
 SIAI S.8
 SIAI S.9
 SIAI S.12
 SIAI S.13
 SIAI S.16
 SIAI S.17
 SIAI S.19
 SIAI S.21
 SIAI S.22
 SIAI S.23
 SIAI S.50 (MVT)
 SIAI S.50 Hydro
 SIAI S.51
 SIAI S.52
 SIAI S.58
 SIAI S.67

SIAI Marchetti 
(Italy)
 SIAI-Marchetti SM.91
 SIAI-Marchetti SM.92
 SIAI-Marchetti SM.95
 SIAI-Marchetti SM.101
 SIAI-Marchetti SM.102
 SIAI Marchetti S.205
 SIAI Marchetti S.208
 SIAI Marchetti S.210
 SIAI Marchetti S.211
 SIAI Marchetti SF.250
 SIAI-Marchetti SF.260
 SIAI Marchetti Canguro
 SIAI-Marchetti SM.1019
 SIAI-Marchetti FN.333 Riviera
 SIAI-Marchetti SH-4
 SIAI-Marchetti SV-20

SIAT 
(Siebel Flugzeugwerke ATG)
 SIAT 222 Super Hummel
 SIAT 223 Flamingo

SibNIA
 SibNIA TVS-2MS

Siddeley-Deasy
(Siddeley-Deasy Motor Company, United Kingdom)
 Siddeley-Deasy R.T.1
 Siddeley-Deasy SR.2 Siskin
 Siddeley-Deasy Sinaia

Sido
(Józef Sido)
 Sido S.1

Siebel 
 Siebel Fh 104 Hallore
 Siebel Si 201
 Siebel Si 202 Hummel
 Siebel Si 204

Siegrist 
(Rudolf Siegrist, Parma, Ohio, United States)
 Siegrist RS1 Ilse

Siemens and FlyEco
Siemens-FlyEco Magnus eFusion

Siemens-Schuckert 
(Siemens-Schuckertwerke)
 Siemens-Schuckert 1911 monoplane
 Siemens-Schuckert B.I
 Siemens-Forssmann Bulldog
 Siemens-Schuckert D.I
 Siemens-Schuckert D.II
 Siemens-Schuckert D.III
 Siemens-Schuckert D.IV
 Siemens-Schuckert D.V
 Siemens-Schuckert D.VI
 Siemens-Schuckert Dr.I
 Siemens-Schuckert DDr.I
 Siemens-Schuckert DD 5
 Siemens-Schuckert E.I
 Siemens-Schuckert E.II
 Siemens-Schuckert E.III
 Siemens-Schuckert L.I
 Siemens-Schuckert Forssman
 Siemens-Schuckert Steffen R.I
 Siemens-Schuckert Steffen R.II
 Siemens-Schuckert Steffen R.III
 Siemens-Schuckert Steffen R.IV
 Siemens-Schuckert Steffen R.V
 Siemens-Schuckert Steffen R.VI
 Siemens-Schuckert Steffen R.VII
 Siemens-Schuckert R.VIII
 Siemens-Schuckert R.IX (project only)
 Siemens-Schuckert Torpedogleiter

Siemetzki 
 Siemetzki ASRO 3-T
 Siemetzki ASRO 4

Sierra 
(Aircraft Industries Ltd (founders: John L Berney, J F Long, Art Wild), 931 E 14 St, San Leandro, California, United States)
 Sierra BLW-1
 Sierra BLW-2

Sierra 
(Sierra Aircraft Co (pres: Leon T Eliel), Sierra Airdrome, Foothill Blvd, Sierra Madre, California, United States)
 Sierra Standard

Siersma 
(Herman Siersma, Detroit, Michigan, United States)
 Siersma SRC-1

Sievers-Miller 
((?) Sievers and Phillip Miller, Valley City, North Carolina, United States)
 Sievers-Miller Special

Sikorsky 
(Igor Ivanovich Sikorsky, Russia)
 Sikorsky S-1
 Sikorsky S-2
 Sikorsky S-3
 Sikorsky S-4
 Sikorsky S-5
 Sikorsky S-6
 Sikorsky S-7
 Sikorsky S-8 Malyutka
 Sikorsky S-9 Kruglyi
 Sikorsky S-10
 Sikorsky S-11
 Sikorsky S-12
 Sikorsky S-13
 Sikorsky S-14
 Sikorsky S-15
 Sikorsky S-XVI
 Sikorsky S-XVII
 Sikorsky S-XVIII
 Sikorsky S-XIX
 Sikorsky S-XX
 Sikorsky S-XXII
 Sikorsky S-XXIII
 Sikorsky S-XXIV
 Sikorsky S-XXV
 Sikorsky S-XXVI
 Sikorsky S-XXVII
 Sikorsky S-28
 Sikorsky Alexander Nevsky (1916 replacement for the IM)
 Sikorsky Ilya Muromets (a.k.a. Grand or Bolshoi Baltiiski)
 Sikorsky Russky Vityaz

 Sikorsky Aircraft Corporation 
(United States)	
 Sikorsky BLR-3
 Sikorsky C-6
 Sikorsky C-28
 Sikorsky H-3
 Sikorsky H-5
 Sikorsky H-7
 Sikorsky H-18
 Sikorsky H-19
 Sikorsky H-34
 Sikorsky H-37
 Sikorsky H-38-SI
 Sikorsky H-39
 Sikorsky H-52
 Sikorsky H-53 all variants of the H-53
 Sikorsky H-54
 Sikorsky H-59
 Sikorsky H-60 all variants of the military S-70
 Sikorsky HJS
 Sikorsky HNS
 Sikorsky HO2S
 Sikorsky HO3S
 Sikorsky HO4S
 Sikorsky HO5S
 Sikorsky HRS
 Sikorsky HR2S
 Sikorsky HR2S-1W
 Sikorsky HR3S
 Sikorsky HR3S
 Sikorsky HSS
 Sikorsky HUS
 Sikorsky HU2S
 Sikorsky JRS
 Sikorsky JR2S
 Sikorsky OA-8
 Sikorsky OA-10
 Sikorsky OA-11
 Sikorsky PS-1
 Sikorsky PS-2
 Sikorsky P2S
 Sikorsky PBS
 Sikorsky RS
 Sikorsky R-4
 Sikorsky R-5
 Sikorsky R-6 Hoverfly II
 Sikorsky V-2
 Sikorsky Cypher
 Sikorsky Cypher II
 Sikorsky S-28
 Sikorsky S-29-A
 Sikorsky S-30
 Sikorsky S-31
 Sikorsky S-32
 Sikorsky S-33
 Sikorsky S-34
 Sikorsky S-35
 Sikorsky S-36
 Sikorsky S-37
 Sikorsky S-38
 Sikorsky S-39
 Sikorsky S-40
 Sikorsky S-41
 Sikorsky S-42
 Sikorsky S-43
 Sikorsky S-44
 Sikorsky S-45
 Sikorsky S-50
 Sikorsky S-51
 Sikorsky S-52
 Sikorsky S-53
 Sikorsky S-54
 Sikorsky S-55
 Sikorsky S-57
 Sikorsky S-58
 Sikorsky S-59
 Sikorsky S-60
 Sikorsky S-61
 Sikorsky S-62
 Sikorsky S-63
 Sikorsky S-64
 Sikorsky S-65
 Sikorsky S-67
 Sikorsky S-68
 Sikorsky S-69
 Sikorsky S-70
 Sikorsky S-71
 Sikorsky S-72
 Sikorsky S-75
 Sikorsky S-76
 Sikorsky S-80
 Sikorsky S-92 Helibus
 Sikorsky S-333
 Sikorsky S-434
 Sikorsky SH-3H AEW
 Sikorsky H-92 Superhawk
 Sikorsky RVR Reverse Velocity Rotor
 Sikorsky SS
 Sikorsky Standard
 Sikorsky UH-60 Black Hawk
 Sikorsky UN-4
 Sikorsky Cypher
 Sikorsky CH-148 Cyclone Canadian Armed Forces
 Sikorsky-Boeing SB-1 Defiant
 Sikorsky VH-92

 Silbervogel 
 Silbervogel Project Plane

 Silence aircraft 
 Silence Twister

Silent Family
(Silent Family Helmet Grossklaus, Westerrade, Germany)
Silent Family Silent Glider e-M
Silent Family Silent Glider M
Silent Family Silent Glider ME
Silent Family Silent Racer

Silesia (First Silesian aircraft factory)
Silesia S-3
Silesia S-4
Silesia S-10

 Silhouette 
(Task Research Inc. / Silhouette Aircraft Inc., Santa Paula, California, United States)
 Silhouette Aircraft SA-60 Silhouette

 Silvanskii 
(A. V. Silvanskii)
 Silvanskii IS 
 Silvanskii I-220

 Silver Wing 
(Silver Wing Aircraft Co (founders: Edward Euler, A H Hogue), 28th & Spruce Sts, Boulder, Colorado, United States)
 Silver Wing 1928 Monoplane

 Silvercraft 
(Silvercraft SpA, Italy)
 Silvercraft SH-4
 Silvercraft SH-200

 Silverston 
()
 Silverston Milwaukee#2

 Simmering-Graz-Pauker 
(Simmering-Graz-Pauker A.G.)
 SGP M-222 Flamingo

 Simmonds Aircraft 
(United Kingdom)
 Simmonds Spartan

 Simmons 
(Herbert H Simmons, 2111 Franklin St, San Diego, California, United States)
 Simmons Sp-1 Sport Monoplane

Simonet
 Simonet SHBF Aviette

Simplex
(Société des Avions Simplex)
see:Arnoux

 Simplex 
(Simplex Aircraft Co (founders: E J & F W Allen), Defiance, Ohio, United States)
 Simplex K-2-C Red Arrow
 Simplex K-3-C Red Arrow
 Simplex K-2-S Red Arrow
 Simplex W-2-S Red Arrow
 Simplex R-2-D Red Arrow Dual Plane a.k.a. Simplex Racer
 Simplex S-2 Kite
 Simplex Special
 Simplex W-5-C

 Simpson 
(F Simpson, Wheeling, West Virginia, United States)
 Simpson Maverick
 Simpson Special

 Simůnek / Kamarýt 
(Jan Simůnek MSc / Jaroslav Kamarýt)
 Simůnek / Kamarýt SK-1 Trempík (Trempík – Little Tramp)
 Simůnek VBS-1

 Sindlinger 
(Fred G Sindlinger, Puyallup, Washington, United States)
 Sindlinger HH-1
 Sindlinger Special#1

 Sink 
(Everett Sink, Zanesville, Ohio, United States)
 Sink S-1

 Sino Swearingen Aircraft Corporation 
 Sino Swearingen SJ-30

 Sioux 
(Sioux Aircraft Co, Sioux City, Iowa, United States)
 Sioux Coupe 60
 Sioux Coupe 90
 Sioux Coupe 90-A
 Sioux Coupe 90-B Junior
 Sioux Coupe 90-C Senior

SIPA
(Société Industrielle Pour l'Aéronautique, France)
 SIPA S.10
 SIPA S.11
 SIPA S.111
 SIPA S.12
 SIPA S.121
 SIPA S.20
 SIPA S.30
 SIPA S.50
 SIPA S.70
 SIPA S.90
 SIPA S.901
 SIPA S.902
 SIPA S.903
 SIPA S.904
 SIPA S.91
 SIPA S.92
 SIPA S.93
 SIPA S.94
 SIPA S.200 Minijet
 SIPA S.251 Antilope
 SIPA S.261 Anjou
 SIPA S.262
 SIPA S.300
 SIPA S.1000 Coccinelle
 SIPA S.1100

Sipowicz
 Sipowicz I

 Sisler 
((A M Bert) Sisler Aircraft Co, Bloomington, Minnesota, United States)
 Sisler SF-1 Pipit
 Sisler SF-2 Whistler
 Sisler SF-2A Cygnet

SITAR
(Sociètè Industrielle de Tolerie pour l'Aéronautique et Matériel Roulant'')
 SITAR GY-90 Mowgli
 SITAR GY-100 Bagheera
 SITAR GY-110 Sher Khan

Sivel Aeronautica
 Sivel SD27 Corriedale
 Sivel SD28

Six Chuter
(Yakima, Washington, United States)
Six Chuter SR1
Six Chuter SR2
Six Chuter SR5
Six Chuter SR7
Six Chuter Power Hawk
Six Chuter Discovery
Six Chuter Legend P103UL
Six Chuter Legend SE
Six Chuter Legend XL
Six Chuter Legend XL Paragon 912
Six Chuter Skye Ryder Aerochute

Sizer
 Sizer Rosette
 Sizer Sapphire

References

Further reading

External links

 List Of Aircraft (S)

de:Liste von Flugzeugtypen/N–S
fr:Liste des aéronefs (N-S)
nl:Lijst van vliegtuigtypes (N-S)
pt:Anexo:Lista de aviões (N-S)
ru:Список самолётов (N-S)
sv:Lista över flygplan/N-S
vi:Danh sách máy bay (N-S)